is a Japanese professional footballer who plays as a forward or midfielder for Major League Soccer club FC Cincinnati.

Club career
At the age of six, Yuya Kubo started playing football for FC Yamaguchi, a local club based in his home city Yamaguchi. From 2006 to 2008, he played at the Konan Junior High School.

Kyoto Sanga
In 2009, at the age of fifteen, Kubo began to play in the Kyoto Sanga FC U-18 team while he was still a high school student. In August 2010, he was promoted to the first-team at the age of sixteen.

In the next 2011–12 season, he mainly played for the first-team scoring 13 goals in 33 matches. He was a key player in the Kyoto Sanga FC team which reached the 2011 Emperor's Cup final scoring in extra time of the semi-final against Yokohama Marinos, breaking the 2–2 deadlock in a match which Sanga would go on to win 4–2. He also scored in the final against FC Tokyo, coming off the bench as he did in the semi-final. His goal was in vain this time however, as FC Tokyo won the match 2–4.

In the 2012–13 season, Kyoto Sanga announced an update to Kubo's contract improving it to pay him as a first team member.

Young Boys
On 18 June 2013, Kyoto Sanga announced Kubo's transfer to Swiss club BSC Young Boys. He made his Swiss Super League debut on 13 July playing 19 minutes in a 2–0 win against FC Sion at the season opener. On 28 July 2013, he scored two goals and made one assist coming off the bench against FC Thun in a 3–2 win. It was his first goal in his third game in the Swiss Super League.

Gent
On 25 January 2017, Kubo was acquired by Belgian club K.A.A. Gent for a transfer fee of €3.5 million. He started in all seven remaining games of the regular season, having an immediate impact by scoring five goals.

Loan to 1. FC Nürnberg
In August 2018, Kubo joined Bundesliga side 1. FC Nürnberg on loan for the 2018–19 season. While his Gent contract was also extended, Nürnberg secured an option to sign him permanently.

FC Cincinnati
On 9 January 2020, Kubo joined MLS side FC Cincinnati as a designated player. On 1 March 2020, he made his FC Cincinnati debut against the New York Red Bulls.

International career
Kubo has been involved in the Japan National Team from U-16 to U-23 level. He received his first call up to the senior team for the Kirin Challenge Cup, a friendly match against Iceland in February 2012, however he did not feature during the 90 minutes.
On 11 November 2016, he made his full international debut for  Japan against Oman in the Kirin Challenge Cup 2016.
On 23 March 2017, he scored one goal and gave one assist in 0–2 win over UAE in 2018 FIFA World Cup qualification. It was his first goal in his third game for Japan.
On 28 March 2017, he scored one goal and added two assists in a 4–0 victory over Thailand in 2018 FIFA World Cup qualification.

Career statistics

Club
.

International

International goals
Scores and results list Japan's goal tally first.

Honours

Kyoto Sanga FC
 Emperor's Cup Runner-up : 2011

Japan U-23
 AFC U-23 Championship Champions: 2016

References

External links

 
 
 
  at BSC Young Boys Official Website 

1993 births
Living people
Association football people from Yamaguchi Prefecture
Association football forwards
Japanese footballers
Japan youth international footballers
Japan international footballers
J2 League players
Swiss Super League players
Belgian Pro League players
Kyoto Sanga FC players
BSC Young Boys players
K.A.A. Gent players
1. FC Nürnberg players
FC Cincinnati players
Japanese expatriate footballers
Japanese expatriate sportspeople in Switzerland
Japanese expatriate sportspeople in Belgium
Japanese expatriate sportspeople in Germany
Japanese expatriate sportspeople in the United States
Expatriate footballers in Switzerland
Expatriate footballers in Belgium
Expatriate footballers in Germany
Expatriate soccer players in the United States
Bundesliga players
Designated Players (MLS)
Major League Soccer players